The 2015 World Table Tennis Championships were held in Suzhou from 26 April to 3 May 2015. The Championship was staged in China for the fifth time and was the 53rd edition of the individual competition. The decision was announced by ITTF in March 2012. Suzhou became the first Chinese host city at prefecture level which had accumulated sufficient experience by hosting three China Open tournaments from 2009 through 2011.

Schedule
Five individual events were contested. Qualification rounds were held from 26–27 April.

Medal summary

Medal table

Events

References

External links
Official website
ITTF.com

 
World Table Tennis Championships
World Table Tennis Championships
World Table Tennis Championships
2015 World Table Tennis Championships
Table tennis competitions in China
Table